Six ships of the Royal Navy have borne the name HMS St Albans after the English city and ducal family of St Albans:

  was a 50-gun fourth-rate ship of the line launched in 1687. She fought at Barfleur in 1691 before being wrecked in a gale in Kinsale harbour in 1693.
  was a 50-gun fourth rate launched in 1706. She was rebuilt in 1718 and served in the war against Spain from 1739, mainly in the West Indies. She was wrecked in Kingston during a hurricane in 1744.
  was a 60-gun fourth rate launched in 1747. She served against the French from 1756 and participated in the Battle of Lagos (1759) before being sold in 1765.
  was a 64-gun third rate launched in 1764.  She served in the American War of Independence from 1777 and was part of the fleet that captured Saint Lucia and won victories at Battle of Saint Kitts and The Saintes. She was converted to a floating battery in 1803, refitted as a 64-gun ship in 1807, recommissioned, and sent out to the East Indies and China. By 1810 she was off Cadiz. She was paid off in 1812 and was broken up in 1814.
  was the American destroyer , transferred to Britain in late 1940 as part of the Destroyers for Bases Agreement. Initially used for escort duties, she was transferred to the Russians in 1944 before being returned to be scrapped in 1949.
  is a Type 23 Duke-class frigate. She was launched in 2000 and is currently in service.

There was also HMS St Albans Prize, an 18-gun sixth rate captured from the French in 1691 and sold in 1698.

Battle honours
Ships named St Albans have earned the following battle honours:
Barfleur 1692
Lagos 1759
St Lucia 1778
St Kitts 1782
The Saints 1782
Atlantic 1941–43
English Channel 1942
Arctic 1942
North Sea 1943

External links 
 Royal Navy

Royal Navy ship names